The Child Act 2001 is a Malaysian law which served to consolidate the Juvenile Courts Act 1947 [Act 90], the Women and Girls Protection Act 1973 [Act 106], and the Child Protection Act 1991 [Act 468]. It was enacted partially in order to fulfil Malaysia's obligations under the United Nations Convention on the Rights of the Child. However, it retains the option of corporal punishment for child offenders. In December 2004, members of the legal community suggested that the law needed review, despite its newness, in order to clarify its criminal procedures. One example of the Act's unclarity was brought to light in a 2007 case involving a 13-year-old convicted of murder. Under Section 97(1) of the Act, capital punishment may not be applied to children; Sections 97(2), 97(3), and 97(4) make provisions for alternative punishments for offences which would result in the death penalty if committed by adults, namely detention at the pleasure of the Yang di-Pertuan Agong. However, Section 97(2) was overturned by the Court of Appeal in July 2007 on the grounds that it violated the Constitution of Malaysia's doctrine of separation of powers, leading to the situation that no punishment at all could be rendered.

The Act was meant to give further protection to child offenders. There are, however, a number of shortcomings missing from the Act. Besides the uncertainty of detention period under Section 97, another omission is the maximum length of the remand order. For an adult offender, Section 117 of the Criminal Procedure Code provides for a maximum of 14 days remand. Section 84(2) of the Child Act simply allows the court to make a remand order without prescribing the maximum length of remand. This problem was subsequently remedied in a 2003 case which held that the Criminal Procedure Code would govern the remand period of a child.

With regard to the trial procedure, an adult accused has the option to give a sworn evidence, unsworn evidence, or remain silent. The Child Act does not provide for any right to remain silent. Section 90(9) merely allows the child to give sworn or unsworn evidence.

Additional protection
The Act has provided extra protection for a child offender especially with regards to the privacy of the child. The trial for the Court for Children shall be in closed court (in camera). Only certain specified persons are allowed to attend the trial. There now a legal duty for the parents of the child to attend the trial.

It also contains provisions to protect the child from associating with adult offenders in prison or elsewhere.

Preamble
Preamble of the Act provides the following recognitions and acknowledgements:
RECOGNIZING that the country’s vision of a fully developed nation is one where social justice and moral, ethical and spiritual developments are just as important as economic development in creating a civil Malaysian society which is united, progressive, peaceful, caring, just and humane
RECOGNIZING that a child is not only a crucial component of such a society but also the key to its survival, development and prosperity
ACKNOWLEDGING that a child, by reason of his physical, mental and emotional immaturity, is in need of special safeguards, care and assistance, after birth, to enable him to participate in and contribute positively towards the attainment of the ideals of a civil Malaysian society
RECOGNIZING every child is entitled to protection and assistance in all circumstances without regard to distinction of any kind, such as race, colour, sex, language, religion, social origin or physical, mental or emotional disabilities or any other status
ACKNOWLEDGING the family as the fundamental group in society which provides the natural environment for the growth, support and well-being of all its members, particularly children, so that they may develop in an environment of peace, happiness, love and understanding in order to attain the full confidence, dignity and worth of the human person
RECOGNIZING the role and responsibility of the family in society, that they be afforded the necessary assistance to enable them to fully assume their responsibilities as the source of care, support, rehabilitation and development of children in society

Structure
The Child Act 2001, in its current form (1 January 2006), consists of 15 Parts containing 135 sections and 2 schedules (including 1 amendment).
 Part I: Preliminary
 Part II: Co-ordinating Council for the Protection of Children
 Part III: Appointment of Protector, etc.
 Part IV: Courts for Children
 Part V: Children in Need of Care and Protection
 Chapter 1: General
 Chapter 2: Temporary Custody and Medical Examination and Treatment
 Chapter 3: Offences in Relation to the Health and Welfare of Children
 Chapter 4: Notification on Taking a Child into Care, Custody or Control
 Part VI: Children in Need of Protection and Rehabilitation
 Chapter 1: General
 Chapter 2: Offences
 Part VII: Beyond Control
 Part VIII: Trafficking in and Abduction of Children
 Part IX: Institutions
 Chapter 1: Places of Safety and Places of Refuge
 Chapter 2: Places of Detention
 Chapter 3: Probation Hostels
 Chapter 4: Approved Schools
 Chapter 5: Henry Gurney Schools
 Chapter 6: Special Provisions in Relation to Places of Safety, Places of Refuge, Places of Detention, Probation Hostels, Approved Schools and Henry Gurney Schools
 Chapter 7: Miscellaneous
 Part X: Criminal Procedure in Court for Children
 Chapter 1: Charge, Bail, etc.
 Chapter 2: Trials
 Chapter 3: Powers of the Court for Children at the Conclusion of Trial
 Chapter 4: Probation
 Part XI: In the Care of Fit and Proper Person
 Part XII: Contribution Orders
 Part XIII: Miscellaneous, Arrest, Search, Seizure, etc.
 Part XIV: Miscellaneous
 Part XV: Savings and Transitional Provisions
 Schedules

First Schedule

Second Schedule

See also
 Children Act

References

External links
Child Act 2001 

2001 in Malaysian law
Malaysian federal legislation
Child safety
Children's rights legislation